Sonya Louise Hartnett (born 1968) is an Australian author of fiction for adults, young adults, and children. She has been called "the finest Australian writer of her generation". For her career contribution to "children's and young adult literature in the broadest sense" Hartnett won the Astrid Lindgren Memorial Award from the Swedish Arts Council in 2008, the biggest prize in children's literature.

She has published books as Sonya Hartnett, S. L. Hartnett, and Cameron S. Redfern.

Writer

Hartnett was born in Box Hill, Victoria. She was thirteen years old when she wrote her first novel and fifteen when it was published for the adult market in Australia, Trouble All the Way (Adelaide: Rigby Publishers, 1984). For years she has written about one novel annually. Although she is often classified as a writer of young adult fiction, Hartnett does not consider this label entirely accurate: "I've been perceived as a young adult writer whereas my books have never really been young adult novels in the sort of classic sense of the idea." She believes the distinction is not so important in Britain as in her native land.

According to the National Library of Australia, "The novel for which Hartnett has achieved the most critical (and controversial) acclaim was Sleeping Dogs" (1995). "A book involving incest between brother and sister and often critiqued as 'without hope', Sleeping Dogs generated enormous discussion both within Australia and overseas."

Many of Hartnett's books have been published in the UK and in North America. For Thursday's Child (2000, UK 2002), she won the annual Guardian Children's Fiction Prize, a once-in-a-lifetime book award judged by a panel of British children's writers. In 2008 she won the Astrid Lindgren Memorial Award which is administered by the Swedish Arts Council.

Landscape with Animals controversy

In 2006, Hartnett was involved with some controversy regarding the publication of Landscape with Animals, published under the pseudonym Cameron S. Redfern. The book contains many sex scenes and Hartnett was almost immediately "outed" as the author. She said that she wanted to avoid the book being accidentally shelved with her work for children in libraries and denied that she used a pseudonym to evade responsibility for the work or as a publicity stunt à la Nikki Gemmell's The Bride Stripped Bare. In a review published in The Age, Peter Craven savaged the book describing it as an "overblown little sex shocker", a "tawdry little crotch tickler" and lamented that Hartnett was "too good a writer to put her name to this indigestible hairball of spunk and spite". It was defended vigorously in The Australian by Marion Halligan ("I haven't read many books by Hartnett, but I think this is a much more amazing piece of writing than any of them") who chastised Craven for missing the joke ("How could an experienced critic get that so wrong?") and wonders why female authors writing frankly about sex is so frowned upon.

Bibliography

Fiction

Picture books

 The Boy and the Toy (2010)
 Come Down, Cat! (2011)
 Blue Flower (2021)
 Shortlisted – CBCA Children's Book of the Year Award: Picture Book (2022)

Junior fiction

 The Silver Donkey (2004)
 Won – Courier Mail award for young readers (2005)
 Won – CBCA Children's Book of the Year Award: Younger Readers (2005)
Won – COOL Award Fiction for Years 7-9 (2007)
 Won – Andersen Award (Italy) Best Book for readers 9–12 (2010)
 Sadie and Ratz (2008)
 The Children of the King (2012)
 Won – CBCA Children's Book of the Year Award: Younger Readers (2013)
 Shortlisted – Prime Minister's Literary Awards Young Adult Fiction (2013)

Teen and young adult fiction

 Wilful Blue (1994)
 produced as a play and performed at the Victorian Arts Centre
 Won – IBBY (International Board on Books for Young People) Ena Noel Award (1996)
 Sleeping Dogs (1995)
 Won – Miles Franklin Kathleen Mitchell Award (Australia) (1996)
 Won – Victorian Premier's Literary Award Sheaffer Pen Prize (1996)
 Honour – CBCA Children's Book of the Year Award: Older Readers (1996)
 Shortlisted – New South Wales Premier's Literary Awards (1996)
 The Devil Latch (1996)
 Princes (1997)
 Shortlisted – CBCA Children's Book of the Year Award: Older Readers (1999)
 All My Dangerous Friends (1998)
 Stripes of the Sidestep Wolf (1999) (first published in the UK in 2004)
 Shortlisted – CBCA Children's Book of the Year Award: Older Readers (2002)
 Thursday's Child (2000)
 Won – Guardian Children's Fiction Prize
 Won – Aurealis Award, Best Young Adult Novel (Australian speculative fiction)
 Shortlisted – Australian Publishers Association Award (2000)
 Shortlisted – CBCA Children's Book of the Year Award: Older Readers (2001)
 Shortlisted – New South Wales Premier's Literary Awards (2001)
 Shortlisted – Mail on Sunday/John Llewellyn Rhys Prize (2002)
 Forest (2001)
 Won – CBCA Children's Book of the Year Award: Older Readers (2002)
 Surrender (2005):
 Honour – Michael L. Printz Award (2007)
 Shortlisted – The Age Book of the Year Award (2005)
 Shortlisted – Aurealis Award Fantasy Division (2005)
 Shortlisted – Commonwealth Writers Prize (South East Asia and South Pacific Region, Best Book) (2006)
 The Ghost's Child (2007)
 Won – CBCA Children's Book of the Year Award: Older Readers (2008)
 Butterfly (2009)
 The Midnight Zoo (2010)
 Shortlisted – CILIP Carnegie Medal (2012)

Adult fiction

 Trouble All the Way (1984)
 Sparkle and Nightflower (1986)
 The Glass House (1990)
 Black Foxes (1996)

 Of a Boy (adult, 2002) (first published in the UK as What the Birds See in 2003)
 Won – The Age Book of the Year Award (2003)
 Won – Commonwealth Writers Prize (South East Asia and South Pacific Region, Best Book) (2003)
 Shortlisted – Miles Franklin Award (2003)
 Shortlisted – New South Wales Premier's Literary Awards (2003) 
 Landscape with Animals (2006), as by Cameron S. Redfern
 Golden Boys (2014)
 Shortlisted – Miles Franklin Award (2015)
 Shortlisted – Christine Stead Prize for Fiction (2015)
 Shortlisted – Victorian Premier's Literary Awards (2015)
 Shortlisted – New South Wales Premier's Literary Awards (2015)

Memoirs

 Life in Ten Houses: A Memoir (2013)

Critical studies and reviews of Hartnett's work
 Review of Golden Boys

See also

References

External links
 
 
 
 Sonya Hartnett at publisher Penguin Books
 2002 interview
 2007 interview

20th-century Australian novelists
21st-century Australian novelists
Australian children's writers
Australian women novelists
Australian writers of young adult literature
Astrid Lindgren Memorial Award winners
Guardian Children's Fiction Prize winners
Writers from Melbourne
RMIT University alumni
1968 births
Living people
British women children's writers
20th-century Australian women writers
Women writers of young adult literature
21st-century Australian women writers
People from Box Hill, Victoria